Mount Burney is a summit in Alberta, Canada.

Mount Burney was named for Cecil Burney, a British naval commander.

References

Burney
Alberta's Rockies